The 95th Ohio Infantry Regiment, sometimes also known as the 95th Regiment, Ohio Volunteer Infantry (or 95th OVI) was an infantry regiment in the Union Army during the American Civil War.

Service
The 95th Regiment, O.V.I, was organized at Camp Chase in Columbus, Ohio and mustered in for three years' service on August 19, 1862, under the command of Colonel William Linn McMillen.

The regiment was attached to Cruft's Brigade, Army of Kentucky, Department of the Ohio. 1st Brigade, 3rd Division, XV Corps, Army of the Tennessee, to December 1863. 1st Brigade, 1st Division, XVI Corps, to December 1864. 1st Brigade, 1st Division, Detachment Army of the Tennessee, Department of the Cumberland, to February 1865. 1st Brigade, 1st Division, XVI Corps, Military Division West Mississippi, to August 1865.

The 95th Regiment, O.V.I., mustered out of service at Louisville, Kentucky, on August 14, 1865.

Detailed service

The 95th's detailed service history is as follows:

1862
The base of operations for the regiment was relocated to Lexington, Kentucky on August 20. A battle took place in Richmond, Kentucky on August 29 and 30th, resulting in a significant number of the regiment being captured. These individuals were exchanged on November 20, 1862. The regiment underwent reorganization at Camp Chase, Ohio until March of 1863.

1863
On March 25, a military unit moved from a location to Memphis, Tennessee. From March 29th to April 1st, the unit moved from Memphis to Young's Point and Ducksport Landing. The unit then engaged in operations against Vicksburg from April 2nd to July 4th. They moved to join the main army in the rear of Vicksburg from May 2nd to 14th and participated in engagements at Mississippi Springs, Baldwyn's Ferry, and Jackson. The unit then participated in the siege of Vicksburg from May 18th to July 4th, including assaults on May 19 and 22nd. They also conducted an expedition to Mechanicsburg from May 26th to June 4th, and an advance on Jackson, Mississippi from July 4th to 10th, followed by a siege of Jackson from July 10th to 17th. The unit then camped at Big Black until November, and conducted an expedition to Canton from October 14th to 20th, including an engagement at Bogue Chitto Creek on October 17. The unit was then ordered to move to Memphis, Tennessee on November 12, and were responsible for guarding the Memphis & Charleston Railroad near the city until February 1864. A detachment was also sent to Lafayette, Tennessee on December 27, 1863.

1864
Expedition to Wyatt's, Mississippi, February 6–18. Coldwater Ferry, February 8. Near Senatobia February 8–9. Hickahala Creek, February 10. Duty at Memphis until June. Sturgis' Expedition from Memphis to Ripley, April 30-May 9. Sturgis' Expedition to Guntown, Mississippi, June 1–13. Brice's or Tishamingo Creek, near Guntown, June 10. Davis, Mills, June 12. Smith's Expedition to Tupelo, Mississippi, July 5–21. Camargo's Cross Roads, near Harrisburg, July 13. Harrisburg, near Tupelo, July 14–15. Old Town or Tishamingo Creek, July 15. Smith's Expedition to Oxford, Mississippi, August 1–30. Abbeville August 23. Moved to Duvall's Bluff, Arkansas, September 1. March through Arkansas and Missouri in pursuit of Price, September 17-November 16. Moved to Nashville, Tennessee, November 21-December 1. Little Harpeth December 6. Battle of Nashville, December 15–16. Pursuit of Hood to the Tennessee River, December 17–28.

1865
The unit was stationed in Eastport, Mississippi until February 1865. They then moved to New Orleans from February 9-22 and subsequently to Mobile Point, Alabama. From March 17-April 12, the unit participated in a campaign against Mobile and its defenses. This included the siege of Spanish Fort and Fort Blakely from March 26-April 8, and the assault and capture of Fort Blakely on April 9. The unit then occupied Mobile on April 12, before marching to Montgomery from April 13-26. After this, they performed duty in the Departments of Alabama and Mississippi until August.

Casualties
During its service, the regiment suffered a total of 276 casualties, including 1 officer and 58 enlisted men who were killed or mortally wounded, and 2 officers and 215 enlisted men who died from disease.

Commanders
 Colonel William L. McMillen
 Lieutenant Colonel Jefferson Brumback - commanded at the battle of Nashville

Notable members
 1st Lieutenant Oliver Colwell, Company G - Medal of Honor recipient for action at the battle of Nashville, December 16, 1864
 Private Otis W. Smith, Company G - Medal of Honor recipient for action at the battle of Nashville, December 16, 1864
 Major William Robert Warnock - U.S. Representative from Ohio, 1901–1905; commander of the Ohio Grand Army of the Republic, 1913–1914

See also
 List of Ohio Civil War units
 Ohio in the Civil War

Notes

References

External links
 Ohio in the Civil War: 95th Ohio Volunteer Infantry by Larry Stevens
 National flag of the 95th Ohio Infantry (probably an unofficial first issue)
 National flag of the 95th Ohio Infantry
 Regimental flag of the 95th Ohio Infantry
 Guidon of the 95th Ohio Infantry
 Another guidon of the 95th Ohio Infantry
 95th Ohio Infantry monument at Vicksburg

Military units and formations established in 1862
Military units and formations disestablished in 1865
Units and formations of the Union Army from Ohio
1862 establishments in Ohio